Chris Murray is a British weightlifter competing in the 81 kg weight class. He won gold at the 2022 Commonwealth Games in Birmingham, England.

References

1999 births
Living people
British male weightlifters
Commonwealth Games medallists in weightlifting
Commonwealth Games gold medallists for England
Weightlifters at the 2022 Commonwealth Games
21st-century British people
Medallists at the 2022 Commonwealth Games